Elizabeth A. "Liz" Malia (born September 30, 1949) is an American politician from the Commonwealth of Massachusetts. A Democrat, she served in the Massachusetts House of Representatives from March 1998 to January 2023.  She represented the Eleventh Suffolk district, which includes parts of the Boston neighborhoods of Jamaica Plain, Roslindale, Roxbury and Dorchester.

In the legislature, she served as Assistant Vice-Chair of the House Committee on Ways and Means. Malia has also served on the Joint Committee on Labor and Workforce Development and the Education Joint Committee.

Malia is originally from Endicott, New York and first moved to Boston to attend college. She graduated from Boston College in 1971 with a BA in Education and English, returning in 1989 to complete the graduate certificate program at the Center for Women in Politics and Government. She worked in human services, healthcare, community organizing and labor advocacy before becoming chief of staff to state representative John E. McDonough in 1990.

In late 1997, McDonough retired mid-term to take up an associate professorship at Brandeis University and Malia jumped into the race to succeed him. She won the special preliminary election easily and went on to win 67% of the special general election vote. She was re-elected in November 1998 and has won biennial re-election ever since. In October of 2021 Malia announced her decision not to run for re-election. 

Malia, a lesbian, co-founded the Bay State Gay and Lesbian Democrats in the mid-1980s. She is one of five openly LGBT members of the Massachusetts General Court, alongside Sarah Peake (D–Provincetown), Kate Hogan (D–Stow), and Denise Andrews (D–Orange), as well as Senator Stan Rosenberg (D–Amherst). In April of 2019, Malia and six other openly LGBTQ legislators were honored for their work by MassEquality and was awarded their Political Icon award for her work advancing LGBTQ rights in Massachusetts.

See also
 2019–2020 Massachusetts legislature
 2021–2022 Massachusetts legislature

References

External links
Legislative homepage

Democratic Party members of the Massachusetts House of Representatives
Politicians from Boston
Living people
Lesbian politicians
LGBT state legislators in Massachusetts
Boston College alumni
Brandeis University faculty
Women state legislators in Massachusetts
1949 births
21st-century American politicians
21st-century American women politicians
20th-century American politicians
20th-century American women politicians